Gainsbourg Live is the second live album by Serge Gainsbourg, released in 1986, featuring an autumn 1985 concert at the Casino de Paris.

Track listing 
 "Love on the Beat" - 9:57
 "Initials B.B." - 3:00
 "Harley Davidson" - 2:46
 "Sorry Angel" - 4:36
 "Nazi Rock" - 4:31
 "Ballade de Johnny Jane" - 2:55
 "Bonnie and Clyde" - 5:00
 "Vieille canaille" - 2:55
 "I'm the Boy" - 6:21
 "Dépression au-dessus du jardin" - 2:22
 "Lemon Incest (abstract)" - 1:14
 "Mickey maousse" - 1:07
 "My Lady Héroïne" - 3:09
 "Je suis venu te dire que je m'en vais" - 3:21
 "L'Eau à la bouche" - 3:03
 "Lola rastaquouère" - 3:28
 "Marilou sous la neige" - 3:11
 "Harley David Son of a Bitch" - 5:33
 "La Javanaise" - 2:50
 "Love on the Beat" (Encore) (Bonus track on LP and cassette versions)

Personnel
Serge Gainsbourg - vocals
Billy Rush - guitar, conductor of orchestra
John K (John Kumnick) - bass
Gary Georgett - keyboards
Tony "Thunder" Smith - drums
Stan Harrison - saxophone
George Simms, Steve Simms - backing vocals

References 

1986 live albums
Serge Gainsbourg albums
Philips Records albums